Durian Tunggal is a state constituency in Malacca, Malaysia, that has been represented in the Melaka State Legislative Assembly.

The state constituency was first contested in 1995 and is mandated to return a single Assemblyman to the Melaka State Legislative Assembly under the first-past-the-post voting system. , the State Assemblyman for Durian Tunggal is Zahari Abdul Khalil  from United Malays National Organisation (UMNO) which is part of the state's ruling coalition, Barisan National (BN).

Definition 
The Durian Tunggal constituency contains the polling districts of Parit Melana, Belimbing Dalam, Bukit Tambun, Pekan Durian Tunggal and Gangsa.

Demographics

History

Polling districts
According to the gazette issued on 31 October 2022, the Durian Tunggal constituency has a total of 5 polling districts.

Representation history

Election results
The electoral results for the Durian Tunggal state constituency in 2004, 2008, 2013 and 2018 are as follows.

References

Malacca state constituencies